Lynne Lund (née Gallant) is a Canadian politician, who was elected to the Legislative Assembly of Prince Edward Island in the 2019 Prince Edward Island general election. She represents the district of Summerside-Wilmot as a member of the Green Party of Prince Edward Island, and serves as the deputy leader of the party.

Electoral record

References 

Living people
People from Summerside, Prince Edward Island
Green Party of Prince Edward Island MLAs
Women MLAs in Prince Edward Island
21st-century Canadian politicians
Year of birth missing (living people)
21st-century Canadian women politicians